The Jury Prize is an award of the Cannes Film Festival bestowed by the jury of the festival on one of the competing feature films. It is the third-most prestigious prize of the festival after the Palme d'Or and the Grand Prix, and it was considered a "second place" award until after the latter award was introduced. According to American film critic Dave Kehr, the award is "intended to recognize an original work that embodies the spirit of inquiry."

History
The award was first presented in 1946. The prize was not awarded on 10 occasions (1947, 1949, 1953, 1967, 1974–79, 1981–82, 1984, and 2001). The festival was not held at all in 1948, 1950, and 2020. In 1968, no awards were given as the festival was called off mid-way due to the May 1968 events in France. Also, the jury vote was tied, and the prize was shared by two films on 21 occasions (1957, 1960, 1962–63, 1970–71, 1973, 1987, 1991–93, 1995, 1998, 2000, 2004, 2007, 2009, 2014, 2019, and 2021-22). Ken Loach and Andrea Arnold have won the most awards in this category, each winning three. Irma P. Hall is the only actress to win in this category, for her role in The Ladykillers (2004). Four directing teams have shared the award: Enrico Gras, Giorgio Moser and Leonardo Bonzi for Lost Continent (1955), Marjane Satrapi and Vincent Paronnaud for Persepolis (2007), Kleber Mendonça Filho
and Juliano Dornelles for Bacurau (2019), and Felix van Groeningen and Charlotte Vandermeersch for The Eight Mountains (2022). Samira Makhmalbaf was the first woman to have won the award, for 2000's Blackboards.

Since 1967, the official name of the award has been simply the Prix du Jury, but it has had two other names since its creation in 1946: the International Jury Prize, which was awarded for that year only, and the Prix spécial du Jury (1951–1967) that was given among other secondary prizes. In 1954, after facing much criticism about the whimsical nature of these awards, the Festival authorities decided to turn to a more traditional prize-giving arrangement. Since then, the Prix spécial du Jury reappeared only twice:
Christopher Hampton won that award for Carrington along with the regular Prix du Jury given to Xavier Beauvois for Don't Forget You're Going to Die in 1995; and David Cronenberg won for Crash in 1996, which was the only prize alloted by the International Jury for that year.

British film academic Andrew M. Butler regards jury prizes such as Cannes' as a way of helping a film gain a distribution deal.

Winners

 Notes
 # Denotes Ex-aequo win
 ‡ Awarded as "Special Jury Prize", a unique award not given annually but only at the request of the official jury.
 * Jury Prize for Acting awarded to actress Irma P. Hall.

Multiple winners

The following individuals received two or more Jury Prize awards:

See also
Palme d'Or
Grand Prix (Cannes Film Festival)

References

External links
 Cannes Film Festival official website
 Cannes Film Festival at the Internet Movie Database

Lists of films by award
Cannes Film Festival